Bruce Beale (16 January 1941 - 17 May 2002) was a former Grand Prix motorcycle road racer from Rhodesia, now known as Zimbabwe. His best year was in 1964 when he finished second in the 350cc Grand Prix world championship, behind his countryman, Jim Redman.

References 

White Rhodesian people
Rhodesian motorcycle racers
2002 deaths
125cc World Championship riders
250cc World Championship riders
350cc World Championship riders
Isle of Man TT riders
Place of birth missing
1941 births